Mevania larissa is a moth of the subfamily Arctiinae. It was described by Druce in 1890. It is found in Ecuador.

References

 Natural History Museum Lepidoptera generic names catalog

Euchromiina
Moths described in 1890